Kalyanpur is a place of Bangladesh, in Dhaka. It is a neighbour of Shyamoli. It is under Mirpur Thana, and it has a sub-post office under the Mohammadpur Exchange-1207. It is on the Dhaka North City Corporation. It is the home of the Kallyanpur Girls School and College, that was established in 1972. This place is popular for inter-district bus counters.

References

Neighbourhoods in Dhaka